Caroline Attardo Genco is an American microbiologist and academic administrator. She is the provost of Tufts University.

Life 
Genco was born to Rita Galletti and Charles Attardo. She completed a B.S. in biology at State University of New York at Fredonia in 1981. She earned a M.S. (1984) and Ph.D. (1987) in microbiology from the University of Rochester.

Genco was a faculty member at the Morehouse School of Medicine and Emory University. She was later a professor in the departments of medicine and microbiology at the Boston University School of Medicine. At Boston University, she researched the link between oral bacteria and heart diseases.

In 2015, Genco joined the Tufts University School of Medicine as the Arthur E. Spiller Professor in Genetics. In 2019, she became vice provost for research. She succeeded Nadine Aubry as provost and senior vice president ad interim of Tufts University on January 1, 2022.

References 

Living people
Year of birth missing (living people)
State University of New York at Fredonia alumni
University of Rochester alumni
Morehouse School of Medicine faculty
Emory University faculty
Boston University School of Medicine faculty
Tufts University School of Medicine faculty
American women academics
American academic administrators
Women academic administrators
21st-century American women scientists
21st-century American biologists
American microbiologists
Women microbiologists
American women biologists